Stefan Ilsanker (born 18 May 1989) is an Austrian professional footballer who plays as a defensive midfielder for  club Genoa and the Austria national team. Ilsanker has represented his country at the Under-19 European Championship and was also a member of the under-21 team. He has been a full senior international since 2014.

Club career
Ilsanker began his career in the youth squad of 1. Halleiner SK as goalkeeper but soon switched into the midfield. In 2005, he signed with Red Bull Salzburg, where he played in the Red Bull Juniors team.

On 4 April 2009, Ilsanker was called up to the first team bench for a league game. His first game for Red Bull Salzburg was a national cup match on 15 August 2009. On 25 August 2009, he played his first international game for Red Bull Salzburg in the UEFA Champions League qualifier versus Maccabi Haifa.

At the end of the 2009–10 season Ilsanker signed with SV Mattersburg. In 2012, he came back to Red Bull Salzburg. In the meantime, he was a regular of the starting team of the club. On 26 February, the club announced, that his contract was extended till 2018.

Stefan Ilsanker was sent-off on 19 December 2018 against Bayern Munich.

On 31 January 2020, Ilsanker joined Eintracht Frankfurt on a deal lasting until 2022. On 3 June 2020, Ilsanker came off the bench against SV Werder Bremen and scored twice in the final 10 minutes of the match to secure a 3–0 victory.

On 23 June 2022, Ilsanker joined Italian club Genoa.

International career

Ilsanker has won over 40 caps for Austria since his debut in 2014. Ilsanker represented his country at Euro 2016, where Austria finished last in Group F. Ilsanker played in two matches for Austria at the tournament, their 0–0 draw with eventual champions Portugal and 1–2 loss to Iceland.

Personal life
Stefan Ilsanker is the son of Herbert Ilsanker, the goalkeeper coach of Red Bull Salzburg.

Career statistics

Club

Honours
Red Bull Salzburg
Austrian Bundesliga:  2013–14, 2014–15
Austrian Cup: 2013–14

Eintracht Frankfurt
UEFA Europa League: 2021–22

References

External links

 Stefan Ilsanker – 2008 Interview (in German)

1989 births
Living people
People from Hallein
Association football midfielders
Austrian footballers
FC Red Bull Salzburg players
SV Mattersburg players
RB Leipzig players
Eintracht Frankfurt players
Genoa C.F.C. players
Austrian Football Bundesliga players
Bundesliga players
2. Bundesliga players
Serie B players
Austria international footballers
Austria youth international footballers
Austria under-21 international footballers
UEFA Euro 2016 players
UEFA Euro 2020 players
UEFA Europa League winning players
Austrian expatriate footballers
Austrian expatriate sportspeople in Germany
Expatriate footballers in Germany
Austrian expatriate sportspeople in Italy
Expatriate footballers in Italy
Footballers from Salzburg (state)